Sherwin David "Wood" Harris (born October 17, 1969) is an American actor. He first garnered attention for his role as Motaw in the Jeff Pollack film Above the Rim (1994), prior to portraying high school football player Julius Campbell in the Walt Disney Pictures film Remember the Titans (2000) and Jimi Hendrix in the Showtime television film Hendrix (2000). He attained further recognition for his portrayal of drug kingpin Avon Barksdale on the HBO crime drama The Wire (2002–2008). Harris also played the role of cocaine dealer Ace in 2002 the crime film Paid in Full.

On television, Harris is also known for playing Brooke Payne on the BET miniseries The New Edition Story in 2017. In addition, Harris starred as Barry Fouray on the VH1 miniseries The Breaks (2016 - 2017), Damon Cross on the Fox series Empire for its fifth and final sixth season, and currently portrays the drug lord "Pat" in the Starz series BMF.

In addition, he has starred in the 2009 dark comedy film Next Day Air, the 2015 Marvel Studios superhero film Ant-Man, the 2017 science fiction film Blade Runner 2049, and the sports drama Creed (2015), along with its sequels Creed II (2018) and Creed III (2023).

Early life and education 
Harris was born in Chicago, Illinois, the son of seamstress Mattie and bus driver John Harris. He was given the nickname "Wood" by friends in his neighborhood, because "Sherwin" was too difficult for some to pronounce. He holds a Bachelor of Arts in Theater Arts from Northern Illinois University (NIU) and a Master of Arts from New York University. He is the younger brother of actor Steve Harris.

Career 
While enrolled in NIU, Harris starred in his first major film role in the basketball drama Above the Rim, opposite Duane Martin and co-starring Tupac Shakur, and appeared in many theatrical stage productions of various off-Broadway plays. Harris subsequently guest-starred in a variety of television and film venues before portraying legendary rock guitarist Jimi Hendrix in Showtime's 2000 film, Hendrix.

Later that year, Harris received his first NAACP Image Award nomination for "Outstanding Supporting Actor in a Motion Picture" along with the Blockbuster Movie Award nomination for "Favorite Supporting Actor in a Motion Picture" for his role as Julius "Big Ju" Campbell in Remember the Titans. In 2002, he starred in the Dame Dash produced cult-classic film Paid in Full, based on the true story of three Harlem drug dealers with Harris playing the real-life kingpin Azie Faison.

He starred as Avon Barksdale, loosely based on the real-life Nathan Barksdale, in the HBO's original series The Wire. He also produced his own debut album, Beautiful Wonderful, which was intended for release in 2005.

In June 2008, director Martin Guigui revealed that Harris was cast as Nate "Sweetwater" Clifton in Sweetwater, a movie about the first black player in the NBA. , it is still in pre-production.

In 2009, Harris starred in the film Just Another Day, as a successful fictional rapper named A-maze. The film centers on a clash between a young up-and-coming rapper and an older one at the top of his game, the former played by Jamie Hector (whose character Marlo Stanfield had a similar role with respect to Harris's character in The Wire).

In 2012, Harris narrated the ESPN 30 for 30 film Benji. In the same year he also played Harold "Mitch" Mitchell in the Broadway revival of A Streetcar Named Desire by Tennessee Williams; alongside Blair Underwood, Nicole Ari Parker, and Daphne Rubin-Vega.

In 2015, he reunited with The Wire cast member Michael B. Jordan for Creed, the latest installment of the Rocky franchise, reprising the role in its sequel.

Filmography

Film

Television

References

External links 
 

1969 births
Living people
African-American male actors
American male film actors
American male television actors
Tisch School of the Arts alumni
Northern Illinois University alumni
Male actors from Chicago
20th-century American male actors
21st-century American male actors